Foz do Iguaçu/Cataratas International Airport , is the airport serving Foz do Iguaçu, Brazil. It is named after the Iguazu Falls and provides air-connections to the falls located at Iguaçu National Park.

It is operated by CCR.

History
Previously operated by Infraero, on April 7, 2021 CCR won a 30-year concession to operate the airport.

Airlines and destinations

Statistics

Accidents and incidents
 18 August 2000: a VASP Boeing 737-2A1 registration PP-SMG en route from Foz do Iguaçu to Curitiba was hijacked by five persons with the purpose of robbing 5 million (approximately 2.75 million at that time) that the aircraft was transporting. The pilot was forced to land at Porecatu where the hijackers fled with the money. No one was injured.

Access
A regular bus service connects the airport to the city.

See also
 
 
 List of airports in Brazil

References

External links
 
 
 

Airports in Paraná (state)
Foz do Iguaçu